Methesis is a genus of South American corinnid sac spiders first described by Eugène Simon in 1896. Originally placed with the ground spiders, it was moved to Corinnidae in 1969.  it contains only two species.

References

Araneomorphae genera
Corinnidae
Spiders of Africa
Taxa named by Eugène Simon